Scymnus impexus is a species of dusky lady beetle in the family Coccinellidae. It is found in Europe and Northern Asia (excluding China) and North America.

References

Further reading

External links

 

Coccinellidae
Articles created by Qbugbot
Beetles described in 1850